Tutu (Marshallese:) is one of the most populous islands in the Arno Atoll. It is located in the Marshall Islands in the Pacific Ocean.

References

Arno Atoll
Islands of the Marshall Islands